Clint Leemans (born 15 September 1995) is a Dutch professional footballer who plays as a midfielder for Danish Superliga club Viborg FF.

Career
Leemans began playing football in the youth of RKVVO in 1998, before moving to the PSV youth academy in 2003. Leemans made his professional debut as Jong PSV player in the second division on 20 September 2013 against FC Den Bosch in a 2–1 away defeat. He came in the field after 81 minutes for Rubén Bentancourt. He's also active as a Dutch youth international.

In the 2020–21 season, he won the "Eredivisie Player of the Month" award for September due to his performances with PEC Zwolle.

Left without contract in July 2021, Leemans moved to Denmark and signed with newly promoted Danish Superliga club Viborg FF on 4 August 2021, signing a deal until the summer 2023.

Career statistics

Honours
VVV-Venlo
 Eerste Divisie: 2016–17

Individual
Eredivisie Player of the Month: September 2020

References

External links

 

1995 births
Living people
People from Veldhoven
Association football midfielders
Dutch footballers
Dutch expatriate footballers
Eredivisie players
Eerste Divisie players
PSV Eindhoven players
VVV-Venlo players
PEC Zwolle players
RKC Waalwijk players
De Graafschap players
Viborg FF players
Netherlands youth international footballers
Netherlands under-21 international footballers
Dutch expatriate sportspeople in Denmark
Expatriate men's footballers in Denmark